Scythris apicispinella is a moth of the family Scythrididae. It was described by Bengt Å. Bengtsson in 2014. It is found in Kenya.

The larvae feed on Acacia tortilis.

References

apicispinella
Moths described in 2014